Bag Raiders are an Australian electronic music duo founded in 2006 by Jack Glass and Chris Stracey. They play keyboards, drums, and act as vocalists, producers, and remixers, with Stracey additionally playing guitar, violin and piano. They also write and produce other artists' work. In 2009, they were rated at number 11 on the Inthemix poll of Australia's top 50 DJs.

In October 2010, they released their self-titled debut album, which peaked at number 7 on the ARIA Albums Chart and received a J Award album of the year nomination. The album's song "Shooting Stars" renewed the band's popularity seven years after its release, when it began being used as part of a popular Internet meme.

History
Both classically trained musicians, Jack Glass and Chris Stracey met in the Cranbrook School, Sydney orchestra practice room with Glass a year ahead playing piano and cello, and Stracey playing violin, guitar and clarinet. In 2005, the pair reconnected and started mixing hip-hop and 1970s rock music CDs, their musical inspirations include Earth, Wind & Fire, The Brothers Johnson, 808 State and Orbital. Bag Raiders as an alternative dance band was then founded in 2006.

The duo first gained traction in with the release of their 2008 EP "Turbo Love". The EP's title track became one of the year's most played songs on Triple J, Australia's foremost national radio station. During this time Bag Raiders were making a slew of remixes some of which gained a lot of popularity on the internet. Their remix of "B.T.T.T.T.R.Y." by the artist K.I.M. ended up being included in the Grand Theft Auto IV soundtrack
 
Bag Raiders released their self-titled debut studio album, Bag Raiders, on 1 October 2010, charting at No. 7 on the ARIA Albums Chart. Their track, "Shooting Stars" was listed at No. 18 in the Triple J Hottest 100 of 2009. In the next year's list, "Way Back Home", reached No. 46. The second single "Way Back Home" debuted at No. 77 on the ARIA Charts on 29 August 2010, it charted at No. 38 on the official German Singles Chart on 6 June 2011 after being used in the German Vodafone TV advertisement and later rose to its peak No. 19. A third single featuring Dan Black, "Sunlight", was released to Australian radio in November 2010. In February 2011 it peaked at No. 84 on the ARIA Top 100. In 2022, Flume remixed the song with Toro y Moi on Triple J's 'Like a Version'.

"Shooting Stars"

Bag Raiders found success with their song "Shooting Stars", released as a single in 2009. The song peaked at No. 62 on the ARIA Singles Chart and made No. 43 on the ARIA 2009 End of Year Top 50 Australian Artist Singles. In August 2013, "Shooting Stars" re-entered the ARIA Singles Chart, reaching the top 50 at #44. In 2017, the song "Shooting Stars" became popular again after being placed in an internet meme featuring people as well as animals falling with surreal, spacey backgrounds. The song's renewed popularity has since been acknowledged by the band itself.

Discography

Studio albums

Extended plays

Singles

Remixes
Lost Valentinos – "CCTV" (Bag Raiders Vs Van She Tech Remix, 2007)
Lost Valentinos – "Kafka!" (Bag Raiders What Y'All Kno' Bout Seven Remix, 2007)
Muscles – "One Inch Badge Pin" (Bag Raiders Remix, 2007)
Kid Sister – "Pro Nails" (Bag Raiders Remix, 2007)
K.I.M. – "B.T.T.T.T.R.Y." (Bag Raiders Remix, 2007)
Bag Raiders – "Fun Punch" (Bag Raiders Remix, 2008)
Cut Copy – "Far Away" (Bag Raiders Remix, 2008)
Galvatrons – "When We Were Kids" (Bag Raiders Remix, 2008)
Headman – "Catch Me If U Can" (Bag Raiders Remix, 2008)
Midnight Juggernauts – "Twenty Thousand Leagues" (Bag Raiders Remix, 2008)
Super Mal – "Bigger Than Big" (Bag Raiders Remix, 2008)
ZZZ – "Lion" (Bag Raiders Remix, 2008)
Monarchy – "I Won't Let Go" (Bag Raiders Remix, 2011)
The Ting Tings – "Silence" (Bag Raiders Remix, 2012)
Banks – "Beggin for Thread" (Bag Raiders Remix, 2015)

Awards and nominations

ARIA Awards
The ARIA Music Awards are annual awards, which recognises excellence, innovation, and achievement across all genres of Australian music. They commenced in 1987.

! 
|-
| 2011 || Bag Raiders || ARIA Award for Best Dance Release ||  ||

APRA Awards
The APRA Awards are held in Australia and New Zealand by the Australasian Performing Right Association to recognise songwriting skills, sales and airplay performance by its members annually.

! 
|-
| 2012 || "Sunlight" (Jack Glass, Christopher Stracey) || Dance Work of the Year ||  ||

J Award
The J Awards are an annual series of Australian music awards that were established by the Australian Broadcasting Corporation's youth-focused radio station Triple J. They commenced in 2005.

! 
|-
| J Awards of 2010
| Bag Raiders
| Australian Album of the Year
| 
|

Notes

References

External links
Official website

Australian electronic musicians
Musical groups established in 2006
Alternative dance musical groups
Nu-disco musicians
Remixers